McCray v. United States, 195 U.S. 27 (1904), was a 1904 case decided by the Supreme Court of the United States that greenlighted the use of the federal taxing power for regulatory purposes. The Court upheld by a 63 vote a federal tax on colored oleomargarine, rejecting contentions that it exceeded Congressional authority. The decision, authored by Justice Edward Douglass White, effectively allowed Congress to regulate intrastate commercial activity by levying taxes on the activity. The justices in the majority refused to examine Congress's motives, instead ruling that the tax was valid because, regardless of the intent behind it, its effect was to raise revenue. Chief Justice Melville Fuller dissented from the decision, which curtailed his own previous opinion in the 1895 case of United States v. E. C. Knight Co. and showed that Fuller's support for a limited federal government could not always garner the support of a majority of the Court.

Background
In the 19th century, chemists in France developed oleomargarine as a substitute for butter. Because oleomargarine was naturally white, which was thought to be unappetizing, manufacturers began adding yellow color to it. Dairy farmers, who were in competition with the product, claimed that coloring it was a deceptive practice, and sought federal legislation to provide competition. Congress enacted a statute to tax colored oleomargarine at a rate of 10 cents per pound, which would effectively destroy the market for that product. McCray, a seller of oleomargarine, sued to have the tax deemed unconstitutional as a deprivation of due process.

See also 
 Canadian Federation of Agriculture v Quebec (AG): Canadian case on banning margarine
 Walter Rau Lebensmittelwerke v De Smedt PVBA: European case on margarine packaging

References

United States Supreme Court cases
United States Supreme Court cases of the Fuller Court
1904 in United States case law
Food law
Margarine
Food colorings